Dominique Arnould (born 19 November 1966 in Luxeuil-les-Bains in Haute-Saône, France) is a French former professional road, cyclo-cross and mountain bike cyclist. As a professional, the greatest wins in Arnould's career were the UCI Cyclo-Cross World Championships in 1993 and a stage win in the 1992 Tour de France. In addition Arnould was the Cyclo-Cross Champion of France five times between 1989 and 2003. He also raced professionally for the Giant mountain bike team, earning several top ten results at world championships in this discipline as well.

Major results

Road

1987
 1st Overall Ronde de l'Isard
1988
 4th Overall Tour du Limousin
 9th Grand Prix de Wallonie
1989
 9th Overall Étoile de Bessèges
 9th Trophée des Grimpeurs
1990
 6th Grand Prix d'Isbergues
1991
 9th GP Industria & Artigianato di Larciano
1992
 1st Overall Giro di Puglia
1st Stage 2
 1st Stage 1 Tour de France
 2nd GP du canton d'Argovie
1993
 1st Stage 2 Tour de l'Avenir
 2nd Overall Grand Prix du Midi Libre
1994
 2nd Bordeaux–Caudéran
 7th Overall Four Days of Dunkirk

Grand Tour general classification results timeline

Cyclo-cross

1986–1987
 1st  National Under-23 Championships 
1988–1989
 1st  National Championships
1989–1990
 2nd National Championships
1991–1992
 2nd National Championships
1992–1993
 1st  UCI World Championships
 1st  National Championships 
1993–1994
 1st  National Championships
 UCI World Cup
1st Saint-Herblain
1994–1995
 1st Overall Coupe de France de cyclo-cross
 UCI World Cup
1st Wangen
1st Sablé-sur-Sarthe
1996–1997
 3rd National Championships
1997–1998
 2nd National Championships
1999–2000
 1st Challenge de la France Cycliste 1, Dercy
 2nd National Championships
2001–2002
 1st  National Championships
 1st Challenge de la France Cycliste 3, Dangu
2002–2003
 1st  National Championships

External links 

Official Tour de France results for Dominique Arnould

1966 births
Living people
People from Luxeuil-les-Bains
French male cyclists
French Tour de France stage winners
Cyclo-cross cyclists
UCI Cyclo-cross World Champions (men)
Sportspeople from Haute-Saône
Cyclists from Bourgogne-Franche-Comté